Anastasia Ivanovna Maksimova (born 27 June 1991) is a Russian group rhythmic gymnast. She is the 2016 Olympics Group champion, the 2015 Worlds Group All-around champion, two-time World Group All-around bronze medalist and three-time European (2021, 2016, 2014) Group All-around champion.

Career 

A veteran in the Russian Group, Maksimova has competed in 4 World Championships, Maksimova appeared in her first Worlds in 2009 (Mie, Japan) where the Russian Group won bronze in Group all-around. she was briefly relegated into the Russian reserve team in 2010 but rejoined the Russian national Group team in 2013.

Maksimova was member of the Russian Group that won the gold medals at the 2013 Summer Universiade in Group All-around, 10 clubs and 2 ribbons/3 balls. Maksimova and the Russian Group won the gold medals in Group All-around, 10 clubs and 2 ribbons/3 balls at the 2013 World Cup series in St. Petersburg, Russia. Maksimova and her Russian teammates won the Group All-around bronze medal at the 2013 World Championships, they won gold in 2 Ribbon + 3 Balls final.

In 2014, Maksimova with the Russian Group became the 2014 European Group all-around champions, in event finals, they won gold in 2Ribbon / 3Balls and silver in 10 Clubs. They repeated as the 2014 World Cup series Group all-around champions and won gold in 10 clubs. At the 2014 World Championships in Izmir, Turkey, the Russian Group only finished 4th in all-around behind Belarus, they won gold in 2Ribbon / 3Balls final.

In 2015, Maksimova was member of the Russian Group that won gold at the inaugural 2015 European Games, they took gold in Group all-around and 5 Ribbons. At the 2015 World Cup Budapest, Maksimova with the Russian Group won gold in Group all-around, 5 Ribbons and bronze in 6 clubs / 2 Hoops. At the 2015 World Cup series in Kazan, Maksimova together with members of the Russian Group won the gold medal in Group all-around, In event finals: they also won gold in 5 ribbons and 6 clubs / 2 hoops.

In 9–13 September, Maksimova together with other members of Russian Group ( Diana Borisova, Daria Kleshcheva, Sofya Skomorokh,  Anastasia Tatareva and Maria Tolkacheva ) competed at the  2015 World Championships in Stuttgart where they won the Group all-around title, eight years later; since the Russian Group won the all-around title in 2007. In apparatus finals, they won gold in 6 Clubs / 2 Hoop and silver in 5 Ribbons.

In 2016, Maksimova and the Russian group won group gold at the 2016 European Championships in Holon, Israel. On 19–21 August, Maksimova was member of the golden winning Russian group (together with Anastasiia Tatareva, Maria Tolkacheva, Anastasia Bliznyuk, Vera Biryukova) that won gold at the 2016 Summer Olympics held in Rio de Janeiro, Brazil.

Shortly after the Olympics, Maksimova completed her competitive sports career by the end of the 2016 Season. However she resumed competition and returned to the national team in 2019.

She was selected to represent Russia in group competition at the 2020 Olympic Games in Tokyo, Japan together with Anastasia Tatareva, Anastasia Bliznyuk, Angelina Shkatova and Alisa Tishchenko.

Detailed Olympic results

References

External links

 
 
 

1991 births
Living people
Russian rhythmic gymnasts
People from Petrozavodsk
Olympic gymnasts of Russia
Olympic gold medalists for Russia
Olympic silver medalists for the Russian Olympic Committee athletes
Olympic medalists in gymnastics
Gymnasts at the 2016 Summer Olympics
Medalists at the 2016 Summer Olympics
Gymnasts at the 2020 Summer Olympics
Medalists at the 2020 Summer Olympics
European Games gold medalists for Russia
European Games medalists in gymnastics
Gymnasts at the 2015 European Games
Gymnasts at the 2019 European Games
Medalists at the Rhythmic Gymnastics European Championships
Medalists at the Rhythmic Gymnastics World Championships
Universiade medalists in gymnastics
Universiade gold medalists for Russia
European Games bronze medalists for Russia
Medalists at the 2013 Summer Universiade
Sportspeople from the Republic of Karelia
21st-century Russian women